Cynodon dactylon, commonly known as Bermuda grass, is a grass found worldwide. It is native to Europe, Africa, Australia and much of Asia. It has been introduced to the Americas. Although it is not native to Bermuda, it is an abundant invasive species there. In Bermuda it has been known as "crab grass" (also a name for Digitaria sanguinalis). Other names are Dhoob, dūrvā grass, ethana grass, dubo, dog grass,  dog's tooth grass, Bahama grass, crab grass, devil's grass, couch grass, Indian doab, arugampul, grama, wiregrass and scutch grass.

Description

The stems are slightly flattened, often tinged purple in colour.

The grass creeps along the ground with its stolons, and roots wherever a node touches the ground, forming a dense mat. C. dactylon reproduces through seeds, stolons, and rhizomes. Growth is promoted by full sun and retarded by full shade, e.g., close to tree trunks.

Cultivation
For example, it is grown in the U.S. mostly in the southern half of the country.

Cultivars 
Hundreds of cultivars have been created specifically for environmental tolerance and stakeholder requirements. New cultivars are released yearly.

Uses

Religious 
Commonly known as "durva" or dūrvāyugma in India, this grass is used in the Ayurveda system of medicine. In Hinduism, it is considered important in the worship of Lord Ganesha. A clump of 21 shoots of this grass is usually offered during puja (worship). It has been a part of Hindu rituals since Vedic times. A unique festival called Durva Ashtami, dedicated to this grass, is celebrated on the 8th day of Shukla Paksha of Bhadra month of the Hindu calendar.

It is known as "Arugampul" in Tamil and "Karuka" in Malayalam and is part of the Dashapushpam  (Ten sacred flowers) in Kerala.

In Nepal, the grass is known as "dubo" and is used by the Hindus. According to Nepalese Hindus, the grass symbolises long life. The grass is an essential item for the Naga Panchami festival as well as the Gaura festival. In a Nepalese Hindu wedding, a garland made of this grass is worn by both bride and groom.

This grass is a Yoruba herb used for Esu or Elegba in the Ifá system of orishas.

Medicinal value 
The rhizomes are reported to act as a diuretic in humans and the grass juice can act as an astringent.

It has been observed that Cynodon dactylon may be selectively eaten by dogs to swiftly induce vomiting when they have gastrointestinal problems. The effect may be due to irritation caused by bristles on the leaf margin.

Other 
It is fast-growing and tough, making it popular and useful for sports fields, as when damaged it will recover quickly. It is a highly desirable turf grass in warm temperate climates, particularly for those regions where its tolerance to heat and drought enable it to survive where few other grasses do. This combination makes it a frequent choice for golf courses in the southern, southeastern U.S and South Africa. It has a relatively coarse-bladed form with numerous cultivars selected for different turf requirements.

Bermuda grass has been cultivated in saline soils in California's Central Valley, which are too salt-damaged to support agricultural crops; it was successfully irrigated with saline water and used to graze cattle.

Professional sports

Bermuda grass is sometimes used as the playing surface at outdoor professional sports stadiums.

National Football League
The following National Football League teams use it as the playing surface in their home stadiums:

Arizona Cardinals (State Farm Stadium in Glendale, Arizona) (Tifway 419 Hybrid Bermudagrass)
Baltimore Ravens (M&T Bank Stadium in Baltimore) (Tifway 419 Bermuda grass)
Chicago Bears Soldier Field in Chicago) (Tahoma 31 Bermuda grass)
Jacksonville Jaguars (TIAA Bank Field in Jacksonville, Florida) (Tifway 419 Bermuda grass)
Kansas City Chiefs (Arrowhead Stadium in Kansas City, Missouri) (Latitude 36 Bermuda grass)
Las Vegas Raiders (Allegiant Stadium in Paradise, Nevada) 
Miami Dolphins (Hard Rock Stadium in Miami) (Tifway 419 Bermuda grass)
Philadelphia Eagles (Lincoln Financial Field in Philadelphia (Tahoma 31 Bermuda grass)
San Francisco 49ers (Levi's Stadium in Santa Clara, California) (Tifway II Bermuda grass)
Tampa Bay Buccaneers (Raymond James Stadium in Tampa, Florida) (Tifway 419 Bermudagrass)
Tennessee Titans (Nissan Stadium in Nashville, Tennessee) (Tifsport Bermuda sod)
Washington Commanders (FedEx Field in Landover, Maryland) (Latitude 36 Bermuda grass)

Major League Baseball
The following Major League Baseball teams use it as the playing surface in their home stadiums:

Los Angeles Angels (Angel Stadium in Anaheim, California) (Tifway 419 Bermudagrass)
Los Angeles Dodgers (Dodger Stadium in Los Angeles) (Santa Ana Bermudagrass)
Oakland Athletics (Oakland Coliseum in Oakland, California) (Tifway II Bermuda Grass)
San Diego Padres (Petco Park in San Diego) (BullsEye Bermuda Grass)
San Francisco Giants (Oracle Park in San Francisco) (Tifway 419 Bermudagrass)

Ecology

Invasive species 
It is a highly aggressive invasive species, crowding out most other grasses and invading other habitats, and has become a hard-to-eradicate weed in some areas (it can be controlled somewhat with Triclopyr, Mesotrione, Fluazifop-P-butyl, and Glyphosate). This weedy nature leads some gardeners to give it the name of "devil grass". Bermuda grass is incredibly difficult to control in flower beds and most herbicides do not work. However, Ornamec, Ornamec 170, Turflon ester (tricyclopyr), and Imazapyr have shown some effectiveness. All of these items are difficult to find in retail stores, as they are primarily marketed to professional landscapers.

The hybrid variety Tifton 85, like some other grasses (e.g. sorghum), produces cyanide under certain conditions, and has been implicated in several livestock deaths.

References

External links

 FAO.org factsheet: Cynodon dactylon
 Cim Antalya factsheet: Bermuda Çim

Chloridoideae
Flora of Africa
Flora of Europe
Flora of Asia
Flora of Australasia
Flora of the Coral Sea Islands Territory
Forages
Lawn grasses
Plants in Hinduism